Fatma may refer to:
Fatima (given name)
Fatma (surname)
Fatma (TV series), a 2021 Turkish miniseries